Chiquito Filipe do Carmo, known simply as Chiquito or Quito (born October 25, 1986) is a football player. He is the current forward for the Timor-Leste national football team.

International career
Chiquito made his international debut against the Philippines in the 2010 AFF Suzuki Cup qualification on 22 October 2010 and scored his first goal on 24 October 2010 when facing Cambodia at the same event.

He also scored Timor-Leste's first goal of the 2018 FIFA World Cup qualifiers against Mongolia in the 4th minute. He doubled the score three minutes after, in a match Timor-Leste would win by 4–1.

International goals
Scores and results list East Timor's goal tally first.

References

1986 births
Living people
East Timorese footballers
Association football forwards
Timor-Leste international footballers
A.D. Dili Leste players
People from Dili
East Timorese expatriate footballers
Expatriate footballers in Indonesia
East Timorese expatriate sportspeople in Indonesia